The New Testament uses a number of military metaphors in discussing Christianity, especially in the Pauline epistles.

In Philippians 2:25 and Philemon 1:2, Paul describes fellow Christians as "fellow soldiers" (in Greek, συστρατιώτῃ, sustratiōtē). The image of a soldier is also used in 2 Timothy 2:3–4 as a metaphor for courage, loyalty and dedication; this is followed by the metaphor of an athlete, emphasising hard work.  In 1 Corinthians 9:7, this image is used in a discussion of church workers receiving payment, with a metaphorical reference to a soldier's rations and expenses.

Ephesians 6:10–18 discusses faith, righteousness, and other elements of Christianity as the armour of God, and this imagery is replicated by John Bunyan in The Pilgrim's Progress, and by many other Christian writers.

Related imagery appears in hymns such as "Soldiers of Christ, Arise" and "Onward, Christian Soldiers".

See also
Miles Christianus
But to bring a sword
Christian soldier (disambiguation)
Christians in the military
Church militant and church triumphant
New Testament athletic metaphors
Prayer warrior
Salvation Army
Spiritual warfare
Military chaplain
Military order (society)

References

Military
Metaphors referring to war and violence
Christianity and violence